She's a Rebel is the debut studio album by Australian recording artist Debbie Byrne. The album was released in November 1974 and peaked at number 63 on the Kent Music Report.

Track listing
LP/Cassette

Charts

References

Debra Byrne albums
1974 debut albums
Festival Records albums